Carmen Mercedes McRae (April 8, 1920 – November 10, 1994) was an American jazz singer. She is considered one of the most influential jazz vocalists of the 20th century and is remembered for her behind-the-beat phrasing and ironic interpretation of lyrics.

Early life and education
McRae was born in Harlem, New York City, United States. Her father, Osmond, and mother, Evadne (Gayle) McRae, were immigrants from Jamaica. She began studying piano when she was eight, and the music of jazz greats such as Louis Armstrong and Duke Ellington filled her home. When she was 17 years old, she met singer Billie Holiday. As a teenager McRae came to the attention of Teddy Wilson and his wife, the composer Irene Kitchings. One of McRae's early songs, "Dream of Life", was, through their influence, recorded in 1939 by Wilson’s long-time collaborator Billie Holiday. McRae considered Holiday to be her primary influence.

Early career
In her late teens and early twenties, McRae played piano at Minton's Playhouse, sang as a chorus girl, and worked as a secretary. It was at Minton's where she met trumpeter Dizzy Gillespie, bassist Oscar Pettiford, and drummer Kenny Clarke, had her first important job as a pianist with Benny Carter's big band (1944), worked with Count Basie (1944) and under the name "Carmen Clarke" (having married Clarke) made her first recording as pianist with the Mercer Ellington Band (1946–47). But it was while working in Brooklyn that she came to the attention of Decca’s Milt Gabler. Her five-year association with Decca yielded 12 LPs.

Chicago interlude
In 1948, she moved to Chicago with comedian and impressionist George Kirby, with whom she had fallen in love. At the end of the relationship, she worked as a pianist and singer at the Archway Lounge. She played piano steadily for almost four years at a number of clubs in Chicago before returning to New York in 1952. In Chicago she developed her own specific style. Those years in Chicago, McRae told Jazz Forum, "gave me whatever it is that I have now. That's the most prominent schooling I ever had."

Return to New York
Back in New York in the early 1950s, McRae got the record contract that launched her career. She was voted best new female vocalist of 1954 by DownBeat magazine. MacRae married twice: to drummer Kenny Clarke from 1944 to 1956, though they separated in 1948; and to bassist Ike Isaacs from 1956 to 1967. Both marriages ended in divorce.

Among her most interesting recording projects were Mad About The Man (1957) with composer Noël Coward, Boy Meets Girl (1957) with Sammy Davis, Jr., participating in Dave Brubeck's The Real Ambassadors (1961) with Louis Armstrong, a tribute album You're Lookin' at Me (A Collection of Nat King Cole Songs) (1983), cutting an album of live duets with Betty Carter, The Carmen McRae-Betty Carter Duets (1987), being accompanied by Dave Brubeck and George Shearing, and closing her career with tributes to Thelonious Monk, Carmen Sings Monk (1990), and Sarah Vaughan, Sarah: Dedicated to You (1991).

As a result of her early friendship with Billie Holiday, she never performed without singing at least one song associated with "Lady Day", and she recorded an album in 1983 in her honor entitled For Lady Day, which was released in 1995, with songs including "Good Morning Heartache", "Them There Eyes", "Lover Man", "God Bless the Child" and "Don't Explain". McRae also recorded with some of the world's best jazz musicians in albums such as Take Five Live (1961) with Dave Brubeck, Two for the Road (1980) with George Shearing, and  Heat Wave (1982) with Cal Tjader. The latter two albums were part of a notable eight-year relationship with Concord Jazz.

Performances
McRae sang in jazz clubs throughout the United Statesand across the worldfor more than fifty years. She was a popular performer at the Monterey Jazz Festival (1961–63, 1966, 1971, 1973, 1982), performing with Duke Ellington's orchestra at the North Sea Jazz Festival in 1980, singing "Don't Get Around Much Anymore", and at the Montreux Jazz Festival in 1989. She left New York for Southern California in the late 1960s, but appeared in New York regularly, usually at the Blue Note, where she performed two engagements a year through most of the 1980s.  In May–June 1988, she collaborated with Harry Connick Jr. on the song "Please Don't Talk About Me When I'm Gone" (S. Clare & S. Stept) in New York City at the RCA Studios, for Connick's debut album, 20. She withdrew from public performance in May 1991 after an episode of respiratory failure only hours after she completed an engagement at the Blue Note jazz club in New York.

Death
On November 10, 1994, McRae died at her home in Beverly Hills, California, at the age of 74. She had fallen into a semi-coma four days earlier, a month after being hospitalized for a stroke.

Awards

Discography
 A Foggy Day with Carmen McCrae (Stardust, 1953)
 Carmen McRae (Bethlehem, 1955)
 By Special Request (Decca, 1956)
 Torchy! (Decca, 1956)
 Blue Moon (Decca, 1956)
 Boy Meets Girl with Sammy Davis Jr. (Decca, 1957)
 After Glow (Decca, 1957)
 Mad About the Man - Carmen McRae Sings Noel Coward (Decca, 1958)
 Carmen for Cool Ones (Decca, 1958)
 Birds of a Feather (Decca, 1958)
 Porgy and Bess  with Sammy Davis Jr. (Decca, 1959)
 My Foolish Heart (Vocalion, 1969), compilation of Decca recordings
 Book of Ballads (Kapp, 1959)
 When You're Away (Kapp, 1959)
 Performing Music from the Subterraneans by André Previn with Gerry Mulligan, McRae on one track (MGM, 1960)
 Something to Swing About (Kapp, 1960)
 Play Dave Brubeck's Points on Jazz with Gold and Fizdale (Columbia, 1961)
 Tonight Only! with Dave Brubeck (Columbia, 1961)
 Carmen McRae at the Flamingo Jazz Club a.k.a. In London (Ember (UK), 1961)
 Carmen McRae Sings Lover Man and Other Billie Holiday Classics (Columbia, 1962)
 Take Five Live with Dave Brubeck (Columbia, 1962)
 The Real Ambassadors (Columbia Masterworks 1962)
 Something Wonderful (Columbia, 1963)
 Live at Sugar Hill San Francisco a.k.a. In Person (Time, 1963)
 Bittersweet (Focus, 1964)
 Second to None (Mainstream, 1964)
 Haven't We Met? (Mainstream, 1965)
 Woman Talk (Mainstream, 1966)
 Alfie (Mainstream, 1966)
 For Once in My Life (Atlantic, 1967)
 Portrait of Carmen (Atlantic, 1968)
 The Sound of Silence (Atlantic, 1968)
 "Live" & Wailing (Mainstream, 1968), recorded 1965
 Just a Little Lovin' (Atlantic, 1970)
 Carmen McRae (Mainstream, 1971), recordings from 1965 and 1966
 Carmen's Gold (Mainstream, 1971)
 Carmen (Temponic, 1972)
 The Great American Songbook: Live at Donte's (Atlantic, 1972)
 Alive! (Mainstream, 1973), compilation of Woman Talk and Live & Wailing
 It Takes a Whole Lot of Human Feeling (Groove Merchant, 1973), re-released combined with Ms. Jazz since 1975 as Velvet Soul 
 Ms. Jazz (Groove Merchant, 1974)
 As Time Goes By - Carmen McRae Alone, Live at the Dug (Victor, 1974)
 Live and Doin' It (Mainstream, 1974)
 I Am Music (Blue Note, 1975)
 Live at Century Plaza (Atlantic, 1975), recorded 1968
 November Girl with Kenny Clarke/Francy Boland Big Band (Black Lion, 1975), recorded 1970
 Can't Hide Love (Blue Note, 1976)
 At the Great American Music Hall (Blue Note, 1977)
 Ronnie Scott's Presents Carmen McRae Live (Pye, 1977)
 Blue Note Meets the L.A. Philharmonic (Blue Note, 1978), four songs by McRae  
 Jazz Gala 79 a.k.a. Live at MIDEM (Personal Choice, 1979)
 I'm Coming Home Again (Buddha, 1980)
 Two for the Road with George Shearing (Concord Jazz, 1980)
 Recorded Live at Bubba's (Who's Who in Jazz, 1981)
 Ms. Magic (Accord, 1982), recorded 1978, also on re-release of I'm Coming Home Again, same sessions
 Love Songs (Accord, 1982), like Ms. Magic
 Heat Wave with Cal Tjader (Concord Jazz, 1982)
 I Hear Music with Chris Connor (Affinity, 1983)
 You're Lookin' at Me (A Collection of Nat King Cole Songs) (Concord Jazz, 1984)
 Any Old Time (Denon, 1986)
 The Carmen McRae-Betty Carter Duets (Great American Music Hall, 1988)
 Fine and Mellow: Live at Birdland West (Concord Jazz, 1988)
 Carmen Sings Monk (Novus, 1990), Grammy nominated
 Sarah: Dedicated to You (Novus, 1991)
 New York State of Mind: Live at Bird (Victor (Jp), 1992), recorded 1989
 For Lady Day Volume 1 (Novus, 1995), recorded 1981
 For Lady Day Volume 2 (Novus, 1995), recorded 1981
 Everything Happens to Me (Jazz Hour, 1997), recorded live at Montreux Jazz Festival 1982
 Dream of Life (Qwest, 1998), recorded 1989
 Ella Fitzgerald and Billie Holiday at Newport (Verve, 2001), recorded 1958, re-release with McRae 
 At Ratso's Volume 1 (Hitchcock Media, 2002), recorded 1976
 At Ratso's Volume 2 (Hitchcock Media, 2002), recorded 1976
 Live at Umbria Jazz (Egea, 2002), recorded live at Umbria Jazz Festival 1990
 Marion McPartland's Piano Jazz (The Jazz Alliance, 2002), recorded 1985
 Last Live in Tokyo (DVD, Nippon Crown, 2004), recorded 1989
 I'm Coming Home Again (Essential Media 2008)

Filmography

Films
1955: The Square Jungle - Herself
1960: The Subterraneans - Herself
1967: Hotel
1985: McRae's rendition of You Took Advantage of Me backed the title credit sequence of Real Genius
1986: Jo Jo Dancer, Your Life Is Calling

Television
 1976: Soul
 1976: Sammy and Company
 1979: Carmen McRae in Concert
 1979: Roots: The Next Generations
 1980: From Jumpstreet
 1981: At the Palace
 1981: Billie Holiday. A Tribute
 1982: L. A. Jazz

References

Further reading

External links

 The Complete Carmen McRae Discography
 Carmen McRae Discography by Akio Kamiyama
 
 
Carmen McRae collection of musical arrangements and other materials, 1931-1993 at the Library of Congress
 Carmen McRae recordings at the Discography of American Historical Recordings.

American jazz singers
1920 births
1994 deaths
African-American actresses
20th-century African-American women singers
African-American jazz musicians
American women jazz singers
American jazz pianists
Bebop singers
Torch singers
Traditional pop music singers
American musicians of Jamaican descent
American people of Costa Rican descent
New York (state) Democrats
California Democrats
People from Harlem
Musicians from Greater Los Angeles
Singers from New York City
Singers from California
20th-century American actresses
20th-century American women pianists
20th-century American pianists
20th-century American women singers
Jazz musicians from New York (state)
Jazz musicians from California
Black Lion Records artists
20th-century American singers
African-American pianists
LGBT African Americans
LGBT people from Pennsylvania
American LGBT singers
20th-century American LGBT people
LGBT people from New York (state)